The McLaren MP4-27 is a Formula One racing car designed by Vodafone McLaren Mercedes for the 2012 Formula One season. The chassis was designed by Paddy Lowe, Neil Oatley, Tim Goss, Andrew Bailey and John Iley and was powered by a customer Mercedes-Benz engine. The car was driven by former World Champions Jenson Button and Lewis Hamilton. It was launched on 1 February at the McLaren team base in Woking, Surrey, ahead of the first winter test sessions at Jerez de la Frontera.  This was the last McLaren car that Lewis Hamilton drove for the team, as he moved to the Mercedes AMG Petronas F1 Team in 2013. This was also the last McLaren Formula One car to win a race until the McLaren MCL35M did so in 2021.

The car achieved 7 wins, 8 poles and third place in the Constructors' Championship in 2012.

Design

The MP4-27 was one of three 2012 cars not to have the so-called "platypus" nose, instead opting for a gradual sloped nose. The Marussia F1 MR01 and HRT F112 also had a similar low nose; the F112 featured a less pronounced step in the nose of the car compared to others on the grid, however, incorporating the two ideas of regulation compliance into the same car.

Performance
After the struggles McLaren experienced in the build-up to the 2009 and 2011 seasons, the MP4-27 demonstrated early promise in testing. This was confirmed at the first race of the season in Australia, when Lewis Hamilton and Jenson Button qualified first and second for the race, the team's first since the 2009 European Grand Prix. Button went on to win the race, with Hamilton finishing third despite team principal Martin Whitmarsh's admission that the team had made a mistake in calculating Button's fuel load, forcing the 2009 World Champion to enter a "severe fuel-saving mode" on the eighth lap of the race.

Wet weather conditions during the race, however, created unpredictable results. Both cars maintained their positions until the race was stopped early in the race. After the race was restarted Button broke his front wing and fell out of the points, whilst Hamilton finished third.

At the 2012 Chinese Grand Prix the Mercedes cars found pace, allowing Nico Rosberg to take his first pole and win. Button started fifth and finished second; Hamilton initially qualified second, but a gearbox change set him back to seventh before he fought through to third place. The result put Hamilton into the lead of the drivers' standings after his third successive third place in the first three races. Button moved up to second, two points behind Hamilton.

The next three races were poor for the team, especially Button as the car seemed to lose the performance advantage it held at the start of the season. In Bahrain, Hamilton finished in eighth and Button retired whilst running in seventh. Consequently, the team lost their lead in the constructors' standings for the first time in 2012 to Red Bull, whilst Sebastian Vettel won the race and overtook Hamilton to lead the drivers' standings. In Spain, Hamilton finished eighth (although he had to fight through the field after being demoted from pole position to the back of the grid when his car ran out of fuel on the in-lap) and Button finished ninth. Button started from twelfth and fell to fourteenth for much of the race before eventually retiring, for his third finish with no points in 2012. The car was also fitted with a much higher front wing starting from that race onwards.

During the 2012 Canadian Grand Prix it brought mixed results in qualifying and the race. Hamilton qualified 2nd, while Button qualified 10th due to a tyre strategy error. Lewis Hamilton became the 7th different driver to win a race in 7 races after he finished 1st, at the same time getting a podium finish for the first time since the 2012 Chinese Grand Prix. Button continued his dismal form by finishing 16th as he struggled due to tyre problems which resulted in a complete lack of pace in a track which he won last year.

However, the 2012 European Grand Prix and the 2012 British Grand Prix proved disappointing for the team once again. In Valencia, despite Lewis Hamilton's 2nd place in qualifying, he was unable to match the pace of Vettel and Alonso in the race and then during his 2nd pit stop, the front jack failed, causing him a delayed pit-stop. To top off his day, he collided with Pastor Maldonado while battling for 3rd place and hit the wall in the closing stages of the race, ending his chances of a podium finish. Jenson Button could only managed 8th position after starting 9th, again struggling with tyres. The British Grand Prix was a nightmare for the team. Hamilton could only manage 8th, while Button qualified 18th, but was promoted to 16th due to penalties of Kamui Kobayashi and Vergne from Toro Rosso. Hamilton eventually finished 8th, while Button finished in 10th place. It became clear that the car might need significant updates before the 2012 German Grand Prix so as to improve recent poor results and get back to winning ways.

However, despite the upgrades, the cars lacked grip in qualifying due to wet weather. Button outqualified Hamilton for the first time in 2012, in 7th place while Hamilton is right behind in 8th place. However, both drivers were promoted to 6th and 7th respectively due to Mark Webber's gearbox change which resulted in a 5 place grid drop. In the race, Button who was running 2nd after the 2nd pit stop but struggled to match both Alonso's and Vettel's pace due to flat spotting a tyre and was overtaken by Vettel in the penultimate lap in turn 6. However, the manner which Vettel overtook is deemed to be illegal as all 4 wheels have been out of the track to overtake. Vettel was giving a time penalty, demoting him to 5th place while Button was promoted back to an impressive 2nd place. Hamilton's 100th F1 race was disastrous. He lost a few positions after a poor start and then suffered a puncture on Lap 3, ending his chances for a points-scoring finish. But he unlapped himself by overtaking Vettel and compromising his race. He then retired on Lap 56 after a mechanical failure in his car.

During the 2012 Hungarian Grand Prix, the efficiency of the upgrades finally showed as the qualifying session was held in dry weather. Lewis Hamilton recovered after the disappointment in the German GP, he was dominant in every practice and qualifying, achieving McLaren's 150th pole position. Button qualified in 4th place. Hamilton finished the race in 1st place, while Button finished a disappointing 6th. Since then McLaren has struggled to attain consistent results due to unreliability. Hamilton qualified in pole positions in Singapore, Abu Dhabi and Brazil  but was unable to translate it to victory as his car experienced mechanical failures in Abu Dhabi and Singapore and being hit by Nico Hülkenberg in Brazil, which was Hamilton's last race for McLaren. All of this happened when Hamilton was leading the race. They also lost 2nd place to Ferrari in the Constructors' Championship. However Hamilton still managed to achieve his last win for McLaren at the new Circuit of the Americas which was the penultimate race of the season and Button's win at the action packed finale at the Brazilian Grand Prix proved to be a small consolation of what was to be a mixed season for them.

Sponsorship and livery 
McLaren used Vodafone logos in all other races except the 2012 United States Grand Prix where it was replaced by Verizon.

Complete Formula One results
(key) (results in bold indicate pole position; results in italics indicate fastest lap)

 Driver failed to finish the race, but was classified as they had completed greater than 90% of the race distance.

References

External links
 McLaren MP4-27

McLaren MP4 27